Charles James Quayle (born 1907) was a football centre-forward who played league football for New Brighton and Crystal Palace.

References

1907 births
English footballers
New Brighton A.F.C. players
Accrington Stanley F.C. (1891) players
Shrewsbury Town F.C. players
Crystal Palace F.C. players
Bradford City A.F.C. players
English Football League players
Year of death missing
Drumcondra F.C. players
Association football forwards